Ninia diademata, the ringneck coffee snake, is a species of snake in the family Colubridae.  The species is native to Mexico, Belize, Guatemala, and Honduras.

References

Ninia
Snakes of Central America
Reptiles of Mexico
Reptiles of Belize
Reptiles of Honduras
Reptiles of Guatemala
Reptiles described in 1853
Taxa named by Spencer Fullerton Baird
Taxa named by Charles Frédéric Girard